Pari class is a patrol boat class of the Indonesian Navy, also known as Type PC-40 patrol boat.

In total, the Indonesian Navy operates 17 vessels of the KRI Pari class with 2 other under construction.

Armaments
The vessel is equipped with PT Pindad-made 30 mm and 12.7 mm calibre machine guns. It also has a combat information room, a communication room and an ammunition store room.

Ship in class

Notable deployments

In January 2021, KRI Kurau (856) was involved in the process of evacuating the Sriwijaya Air Flight 182 crash with 11 other Indonesian Navy ships.

References

2006 ships
Patrol vessels of the Indonesian Navy
Patrol boat classes